Tawba (  alternatively spelled: tevbe or tawbah) is the Islamic concept of repenting to God due to performing any sins and misdeeds. It is a direct matter between a person and God, so there is no intercession. There is no original sin in Islam. It is the act of leaving what God has prohibited and returning to what he has commanded. The word denotes the act of being repentant for one's misdeeds, atoning for those misdeeds, and having a strong determination to forsake those misdeeds (remorse, resolution, and repentance). If someone sins against another person, restitution is required.

Etymology
The literal meaning of the Arabic word tawba is "to return" and is repeated in the Qur'an and hadith (sayings of the Islamic prophet Muhammad). In the context of Islam, it means to turn or to retreat from past sinful and evil activities, and to firmly resolve to abstain from them in future. In , the word tawba has been associated with the word نصوح (nasūh) which means "to make pure or sincere". Thus, tawba signifies sincere and faithful repentance, free from pretense and hypocrisy.

In Islamic scripture

Quran
In the Quran, there is a complete surah (chapter) titled At-Tawba, which means "The Repentance". As with other topics, the act of atoning (for one's misdeeds) and seeking God's forgiveness has also been discussed in the Qur’an, and given much importance. For those believers who have wronged themselves, the Qur'an asks them to become repentant, seek Allah's forgiveness, and make a sincere tawba. It assures them that if they do this, God will forgive them, and exonerate them from their misdeeds:

The Qur'an also addresses the disbelievers and urges them to turn to God, upon which God promises to pardon them:

Sunnah
Like Quran, the hadith also mentions and stresses the importance of tawba:
 In Sunan al-Tirmidhi, a Hadith is narrated:
 In Sahih al-Bukhari, Anas ibn Malik narrates:

 In Sahih Muslim, Abu Ayyub al-Ansari and Abu Huraira narrate:

 In Sahih Bukhari, Abu Said Al-Khudri narrates:

 In Sahih al-Bukhari and Sahih Muslim narrated Abdullah ibn Masud,

 In Sahih Muslim narrated Anas ibn Malik,

Theological viewpoints
Since the issue of tawba or repentance arises from Islamic religious context, it can be understood well when discussed from that perspective.

Repentance to Allah alone
Islam does not view any human being as being infallible. Any human being can be subject to errors, Allah being the only perfect one. Thus the sole authority for the forgiveness of any human being corresponds to Allah. Muslims deny the authority of men to listen to another person's confessions and then pronounce him forgiven of his sin. Likewise repenting to anyone besides Allah is forbidden. The Quran states:

Tawba

Tawba and the benevolence of Allah
Sincere tawba is always accepted by Allah. Allah says:

In numerous verses of the Quran, Allah describes Himself as being extremely generous, merciful, and forgiving towards His creations. In verse 22 of sura Al-Hashr, for example, He assures: "He is Allah besides Whom there is no God; the Knower of the unseen and the seen; He is the Beneficent, the Merciful".

The use of the verse "In the name of Allah, the Benevolent, the Merciful" at the beginning of every sura (except one) further testifies to this fact. According to the Quran and Hadith, Allah's overarching mercy permits even the gravest sins to be pardoned by Him, provided the wrongdoer intends a sincere tawba.

Shirk is an unforgivable sin if one dies without repenting from it:
As such, becoming hopeless of the mercy of Allah is prohibited. The Quran declares:

Again, God says to the believers in a Hadith Qudsi:"O son of Adam, so long as you call upon Me, and ask of Me, I shall forgive you for what you have done, and I shall not mind. O son of Adam, were your sins to reach the clouds of the sky and were you then to ask forgiveness of Me, I would forgive you. O son of Adam were you to come to Me with sins nearly as great as the earth, and were you then to face Me, ascribing no partner to Me, I would bring you forgiveness nearly as great as it."

Conditions of tawba
According to Islamic Sharia, when an act of tawba is performed by a Muslim, Allah generally accepts it. However, that tawba should be sincere and true. Islamic scholars agree upon the fact that if a person is not ashamed of his past misdeeds, or does not intend to forsake those, then his verbal announcement of tawba is an open mockery of repentance. Mere verbal repentance does not account for a true tawba. A sincere tawba has some criteria.

Ali was asked as to what is tawba, and he replied that tawba consists of six elements:

 to regret one's past evil deeds;
 to carry out Divine duties (fard, wajib etc.) that were missed;
 to return the rights/properties of others that were usurped unjustly;
 to ask forgiveness of a person who has been wronged by him, physically or verbally;
 to make a firm resolve of avoiding the sin in future; and
 to employ oneself in Allah's obedience, as he previously employed himself in Allah's disobedience.

In Islamic sharia, tawba is a twofold approach: a person first should be able to recognize and forsake his/her sins upon which Allah promises to forgive them. Islam expects Muslims to realize their mistakes and shortcomings, and to seek His forgiveness. Forgiveness for one's sins is not something that comes automatically; it is something that must be sought for, with sincereness and true devotion. Becoming indifferent to one's sins is seen as dangerous. Muhammad said:

Another important perspective on repentance in Islam is that a person should always seek God's forgiveness even when they are not apparently guilty of any particular sin. This is because there are many subtle natures of sin involving immorality which escape notice, and also because it is a Muslim's duty to turn towards God.
 In hadith, Muhammad asked people to seek Allah's forgiveness: "O people, seek repentance from Allah. Verily, I seek repentance from Him a hundred times a day."
 In Islamic sharia, submission to Allah is necessary not only for achieving God's forgiveness, but also for being worthy of entering into paradise. Muhammad said: "Do good deeds properly, sincerely and moderately, and receive good news because one's good deeds will not make him enter Paradise." The companions asked, "Even you, O Allah's Apostle?" He said, "Even I, unless and until Allah bestows His pardon and Mercy on me."

Demerits of turning away from tawba
Turning away from repentance or postponement of tawbah, was attached with some ill-effects including the follows:
 He who turns away from tawbah was referred to as an Unjust.
 He who decides to postpone his repentance till his last breath, his repentance shall not be accepted.
 Postponement of tawbah according to Islam was seen as a great sin.

See also

References

External links
 'Tawbah' (Repentance) in Islam
 The way of making Taubah
 Muhammad Al-Munajjid -  Prophet's Methods Of Correcting People's Mistakes - (English)

Islamic terminology
Repentance